Endothiella is a genus of fungi within the family Cryphonectriaceae.

Species
Endothiella aggregata
Endothiella anacardiacearum
Endothiella caraganae
Endothiella coccolobae
Endothiella gyrosa
Endothiella havanensis
Endothiella japonica
Endothiella longirostris
Endothiella macrospora
Endothiella natalensis
Endothiella nitschkei
Endothiella parasitica
Endothiella robiniae
Endothiella simonianii
Endothiella singularis
Endothiella tropicalis
Endothiella viridistroma
Endothiella vismiae

References

External links

Sordariomycetes genera
Diaporthales